Elson José Dias Júnior (born 10 April 1991 in Minas Gerais, Brazil), known as Elsinho, is a Brazilian professional footballer who plays for Racing de Ferrol.

References

External links
 Elson José Dias Junior Statistics from Ascenso MX
 SoccerWay

1991 births
Living people
Sportspeople from Minas Gerais
Brazilian footballers
Association football midfielders
Campeonato Brasileiro Série B players
Clube Atlético Votuporanguense players
Nacional Esporte Clube (MG) players
Sociedade Esportiva Matonense players
Oeste Futebol Clube players
Rio Claro Futebol Clube players
Liga MX players
Ascenso MX players
FC Juárez footballers
Club Celaya footballers
Segunda División B players
Racing de Ferrol footballers
Brazilian expatriate footballers
Brazilian expatriate sportspeople in Mexico
Brazilian expatriate sportspeople in Spain
Expatriate footballers in Mexico
Expatriate footballers in Spain